Romanoro is a small hamlet in the province of Modena in central Italy, administratively a frazione
of Frassinoro.

Right below the town flows the Dolo mountain stream. A dam exists at the top of Fontanaluccia, that deviates part of the water about  downward to the hydroelectric power plant located in the nearby Farneta.

History

Construction of a bridge over the Valoria landslide had been planned since 2006. The bridge was completed in 2007.

Images

See also
 
 Bibulca Way
 Villa Minozzo

References

Frazioni of the Province of Modena
Cities and towns in Emilia-Romagna
Frassinoro